Rotational falls occur when a horse falls in such a manner as to somersault before landing on its back.  It is of particular concern in the sport of eventing, especially in the cross country phase of the competition. These falls can cause grave injuries and in the past have resulted in fatalities; such fatalities have spiked in recent years, prompting investigations and movements worldwide to increase the safety for participants.

Eventing is a three-phase competition consisting of dressage, cross-country, and show jumping. Riders worldwide compete in eventing, up to an Olympic level.

What is a rotational fall? 
Falls of the rider from the horse are common and can occur at any point in time, from training to the middle of a competition. Horse riding is described as a "hazardous pastime", with a high level of injuries and in some cases, death. One large contributor to these fatality statistics is that of a rotational fall. "Between May 1997 and September 2007 25 rider deaths occurred around the world in the sport of Eventing", 18 of these fatalities resulted from rotational falls.

A rotational fall is defined as when the "horse forward somersaults in the air before landing on its back.” This often occurs as a result of the horse hitting the fence with its front legs while jumping. The possibility of a fall occurring can be increased by a variety of factors including; condition of ground, experience of rider, experience of horse, type of jump, undertaking of course prior to fall and/or position on the scoreboard.

Why are rotational falls most likely to occur in the sport of eventing? 
The cross country phase of eventing presents a course of obstacles that the horse and rider must navigate through to the finish line, these obstacles are solid and unforgiving (photos below show examples of jumps on a course). The jumps being solid "demands that a rider approach the jump at exactly the right speed, take off from the right angle and spot". Rotational falls are most likely to occur during cross country as the fall occurs when the "horse hits a solid fence either with its chest or upper forelegs". This becomes increasingly likely the higher the jumps get. Although historically, rotational falls were possible in the show jumping phase as rails used to be fixed to the wings that held them, in modern times the jumps are designed with cups holding the rails, allowing them to roll out and fall down if struck by the horse.

Background and case studies 
All sports and activities present unique risks (ranging from small to large scale possibilities) to the individual or team participating in them. Eventing is no different, it is considered a "high-risk equestrian sport". Injuries to both horse and rider as a result of competition in Eventing have occurred throughout history and across the world, it is "a sport in which the vast majority of rider injuries are minor and insignificant, but in which the possibility of catastrophic results always exist".

Statistics 
Although Eventing as a sport dates to 1902, it wasn't until 1999 that concerns of horse and rider safety emerged. That year, there were five rider fatalities as a result of falls in the United Kingdom alone, four out of these five riders had a rotational fall by their horse leading to their death. As a result of these fatalities, in April 2000 the Fédération Equestre Internationale (FEI) conducted "The International Eventing Safety Committee Report" and recommended creating an FEI Annual Report to cover a variety of subjects. Between 1997 and 2008, "at least 37 eventing riders have died as a result of injuries incurred while competing in the cross-country phase of eventing". At least 25 of these deaths were as a result of a rotational fall. These deaths ranged in location (concentrations of deaths in the United States and United Kingdom) and level of competition (pony club, national or international competition). However, some "top competitors, coaches and course designers argue that the sport's death and injury toll is most likely related to an influx of new riders to the sport", suggesting a lack of experience increases the likelihood of suffering a fall.

The FEI conducted a statistic report on Eventing Risk Management, presenting statistics on competitions, starters, falls and injuries between 2006 and 2016. In 2006 there were a total of 13,660 starters, with 789 falls, of these falls 51 were classified as rotational horse falls and 12 were considered to result in the rider suffering serious injuries. However, ten years later in 2016 there has been a significant increase (of 6261 riders) in starters to 19,921 riders, of these there were 1064 falls. However, despite an increase in both competitors and overall falls only 30 of these were classified as rotational falls, and 5 riders were considered to result in the rider suffering serious injuries. Comparing these rotational fall statistics across a ten-year expanse convey a clear decrease in rotational falls and rotational falls resulting in serious injury.

Recent cases of rotational falls resulting in fatalities

Australian cases 
On 16 May 2021, Kasheer, ridden by Usman Khan, a Pakistan Olympic hopeful, died during a rotational fall at the Naracoorte Horse Trials 4 star event in South Australia, an Olympic qualifier. Kasheer caught his knee on the final jump of the cross-country leg on Sunday and suffered a rotational fall, landing on his neck. He died instantly of a proximal cervical fracture.

On 6 March 2016 Olivia Inglis and her horse Coriolanus (also known as Togha) were competing in the cross country phase of Scone Horse Trials, in New South Wales, Australia. At fence 8A/8B Inglis and Togha successfully jumped the first fence. However, "in the process of jumping the second fence” the horse and rider fell.  Inglis was fatally injured. This fatality came as a great shock to the Australian and worldwide eventing community, with Judy Fasher, the Chair of Equestrian Australia describing the incident as "absolutely horrendous" and "something that we couldn't have predicted.”

On 30 April 2016, almost seven weeks after the death of Olivia Inglis, Caitlyn Fischer and her horse Ralphie embarked on the cross country phase of the Sydney International Horse Trials located at the Sydney International Equestrian Centre (SIEC) in Horsley Park. At fence two, "a fence only 210 metres from the start of the cross country course”, the pair fell, and Fischer was fatally injured. Again, Fasher released a statement commenting that it was "shocking for everybody involved".

In 2019, a Coroner's Inquest was conducted into the deaths of both Olivia Inglis and Caitlyn Fischer. Both were considered a "reportable death" and both bought up similar broader concerns regarding safety issues within the sport of eventing. As a result of the investigation into these two tragic deaths, a wide range of recommendations were made by the Coroner into the following areas: safety officers, course design, review processes, event management, athlete representatives, personal protective equipment, data collection, medical coverage, event organisation and fence judges.

British cases 
On 4 September 2004, Caroline Pratt a widely celebrated British Eventer ("narrowly missed being part of the Athens (Olympic) team") was competing in the Burghley Horse Trials with her horse Primitive Streak. On reaching the water jump the combination had a rotational fall, after which Caroline lay emerged "in about two feet of water", despite resuscitation attempts at the scene and in hospital she died. A Sunday Telegraph reporter in the crowd reported that in the audience "many of them were crying. It was a terrible thing to see", another Telegraph reporter Beany McLean, equestrian correspondent said, "it was one of those falls that make your heart sink straight away".

On 11 August 2019, Iona Sclater and her horse Jack were training at her Cambridgeshire home when, while jumping a hay bale approximately 1.32 meters high the horse clipped the jump resulting in a rotational fall. The coroner's report recorded the death as accidental and "the cause of death as given as a crush injury to her chest". The teenager has been described by British eventing as an "exceptionally talented and dedicated young event rider".

American cases 
On 14 May 2016, Philippa Humphreys, riding her horse Rich N Famous in the CCI*** at Jersey Fresh International Three-Day Event, held in New Jersey. The combination experienced a rotational fall at a Table, fence 16, and despite the efforts of nurses, the fall was fatal to Philippa. The FEI secretary general at the time Sabrina Ibáñez commented, "this was a terrible accident resulting in the tragic loss of an experienced rider".

On 11 July 2019, Ashley Stout and her horse Avant Garde were cross country training/schooling at Standing Ovation Equestrian Centre in Halfmoon Township, Pennsylvania. Following what was believed to be a rotational fall, the 13-year-old rider and her horse both died. The centre released a statement, saying "tonight we mourn an unfathomable loss; two incredibly beautiful souls", the centre's owner Adam Armstrong commenting that "it's the worst type of fall that could happen".

Improving safety

Horse and rider safety 
Horse riding is considered a dangerous sport. However, "while equestrian sports are considered to have a certain degree of risk associated with them, there are ways to make them safer". Safety measures have been and continue to be introduced over time to reduce these risks; these measures revolve around both the rider, the horse and the event.

Helmets

The rules of competition as guided by the FEI and individually enforced by countries around the world with their own bodies drafting standards for riders state that all riders are required to wear "an accredited safety helmet during cross country competition". These standards are reviewed and updated regularly by both the FEI and individual countries. For example, Equestrian Australia have introduced a new regulation, Helmet Tagging. This will "enable officials to more easily identify those helmets complying with standards", all helmets but have a coloured tag on them visible to officials which conveys the helmet has been checked and complies to current standards.

Body protectors 
Body protectors are pieces of equipment used by riders in many different types of riding; one particular type is the cross country phase of eventing. A body protector traditionally "is a foam filled vest to be worn over clothes". It is designed to protect the upper body (ribs and spine) from serious injury if a fall occurs. The regulation of body protectors had been discussed by the National Eventing Committee (NEC) many times, however, "only by the end of 2006 did the NEC decide that body protectors would be compulsory". Between 2000 and 2006 a study was conducted on body protectors in which riders were asked 'Were you wearing a back protector?', over 90% of riders "indicated that they were wearing one, despite there being no regulation of requiring this".

In 2009 a new type of body protector was introduced, inflatable vests. The design is of "a gas canister, connected by a cord to the horse's saddle, is discharged when the cord is pulled during a fall, inflating the jacket in a fraction of a second". This design has the potential to reduce the chance of fatality as a result of a rotational fall due to its design aiming to disperse the force of an impact "and reduce compression of the chest".

Greasing legs 
Although there are less protective measures available for horses, one key technique used by riders to increase the safety of the course for the horse is greasing legs. Riders place grease on "a horse's front and hind legs to prevent trauma from the brush jumps, and if they hit an obstacle, they'll slide off it a little bit more". This particularly assists in the prevention of rotational falls as it encourages the legs, even if they hit the jump to slide over, as opposed to be caught or left behind causing a possible trip or rotational fall.

Safety of the course 
The cross country course itself poses the largest risks to the horse and rider for experiencing a rotational fall, this is due to the uniquely solid nature of jumps on a cross country course (as opposed to collapsible fences on a show jumping course). Over the years there have been many discussions regarding methods and technologies available to improve the safety of a fence and the "breakability" of a fence is at the centre of discussions. An "extreme version of maximising breakability would be just putting show jumps in a field", however that has been criticised as it defeats the purpose of the challenge of the cross country phase as uniquely different from the show jumping phase. Two key technological advances have been adopted improve the safety in the cross country phase of eventing to minimise the possibility of a rotational fall.

Frangible pins and mim clips 
Frangible pins and mim clips are "pins and hinges that break and swing down if a horse hits it, reducing the chances of a fall for both rider and horse". However, as this technology is relatively new they are still learning the 'in field' mechanisms of the pins and clips, "the important thing to remember is that a device is just a mechanical object that will do certain things under certain circumstances according to its design". Statistics on the use of frangible pins demonstrate that "angles and impact factor in" to the technical process of a pin or clip breaking allowing the jump to fall. The devices ensure that although "horse falls cannot be completely avoided... the use of frangible devices allows the fence to drop on contact therefore preventing a horse from falling". The horse is more likely to trip and regain an upright position, as opposed to performing a full rotation. In commenting on the introduction of frangible pins to Australia in the Equestrian Australia 'Making Eventing Safer Fund', "dual Olympic medallist, course designer and coach Stuart Tinney" said "it's very exciting to be able to introduce more safer fences to Eventing".

EquiRatings 
The EquiRatings Quality Index (ERQI) is "a tool used by various federations around the world to identify and then categorise horses competing with above average likelihoods of unsuccessful outcomes". Studies are conducted over four continents and on approximately 80,000 horses each week to assess the huge variety of risks posed to unique horse and rider combinations competing on different courses across the world. The EquiRatings philosophy follows a cyclical process of "Measure, Improve, Repeat", to assist individuals and teams with the process of predicting and minimising risks in horse riding.

See also
List of horse accidents
Eventing
Cross country riding

References 

Eventing
Deaths in sport
Horse-related accidents and incidents